Study for a Bullfight, Number 2 is an oil on canvas painting by Francis Bacon executed in 1969. The painting now belongs to the Museum of Fine Arts of Lyon, which acquired it in 1997. It is the second on a series of three paintings which also include Study for a Bullfight, Number 1 and Study for a Bullfight, Number 3, all executed in 1969.

Sources

Paintings by Francis Bacon
Paintings in the collection of the Museum of Fine Arts of Lyon
1969 paintings